An English translation of soil types defined in "référentiel pedologique français" can be done this way. it is relevant for European soils :

Alocrisol humic
Alocrisol typic
Aluandosol haplic
Aluandosol humic
Aluandosol perhydric
Anthroposol artificial
Anthroposol reconstituted
Anthroposol transformed
Arenosol
Brunisol mesosatured
Brunisol oligo-satured
Brunisol resatured
Brunisol satured
Calcarisol
Calcisol
Calcosol
Chernosol haplic
Chernosol melanoluvic
Chernosol typic
Colluviosol
Cryosol histic
Cryosol mineral
Dolomitosol
Fersialsol calcic
Fersialsol carbonated
Fersialsol eluvic
Fersialsol insatured
Fluviosol brunified
Fluviosol brut
Fluviosol typic
Grisol degraded
Grisol eluvic
Grisol haplic
Gypsosol haplic
Gypsosol petrogypsic
Histosol composite
Histosol fibric
Histosol flottant
Histosol leptic
Histosol mesic
Histosol recouvert
Histosol sapric
Leptismectisol
Lithosols
Lithovertisol
Luvisol degraded
Luvisol dernic
Luvisol tronqued
Luvisol typic
Magnesisol
Neoluvisol
Organosol calcaire
Organosol calcic
Organosol insatured
Organosol tangelic
Paravertisol haplic
Paravertisol planosolic
Pelosol brunified
Pelosol differencied
Pelosol typic
Peyrosol cailloutic
Peyrosol pierric
Phaeosol haplic
Phaeosol melanoluvic
Planosol distal
Planosol structural
Planosol typic
Podzosol duric
Podzosol eluvic
Podzosol humic
Podzosol humo-duric
Podzosol meuble
Podzosol ocric
Podzosol placic
Post-podzosol
Pseudo-luvisol
Quasi-luvisol
Rankosol
Reductisol
Reductisol duplic
Reductisol stagnic
Reductisol typic
Regosol
Rendisol
Rendosol
Salisodisol
Salisol carbonated
Salisol chloruro-sulfated
Silandosol dystric
Silandosol eutric
Silandosol humic
Silandosol perhydric
Sodisalisol
Sodisol indifferencied
Sodisol solodised
Sodisol solonetzic
Sulfatosol
Thalassosol
Thiosol
Topovertisol
Veracrisol
Vitrosol

Soil
Pedology
Types of soil